Eduardo Nicolás Espin (born 22 September 1972) is a former professional tennis player from Spain.

Nicolas played most of his doubles career beside Germán Puentes, his partner in all five of his Grand Slam appearances. They failed to win a single Grand Slam match but did reach the semi-finals of the Swedish Open in 1999 and win six Challenger titles.

As a singles player he was a quarter-finalist in the 1999 Prague Open, defeating world number 65 Ján Krošlák and German Markus Hantschk. He was eliminated in the quarter-finals by his doubles partner, Puentes.

Challenger titles

Doubles: (6)

References

1972 births
Living people
Spanish male tennis players
Tennis players from Barcelona